Fred Rogers Productions is an American non-profit organization specializing in children's programming for public television in the United States. The organization was started by Fred Rogers and was initially renamed in his honor to The Fred Rogers Company after his death. Under a previous name, Family Communications, Inc., the organization produced its flagship program, Mister Rogers' Neighborhood.

Founded in 1971, Family Communications replaced Small World Enterprises, a for-profit company created in 1955 primarily to license and sell merchandise tied in with Mister Rogers' Neighborhood and his earlier series, The Children's Corner. In 1985, it struck a deal with CBS/Fox Video to release home video titles.

In the early 2010s, The Fred Rogers Company began producing new programming, including:

 Daniel Tiger's Neighborhood, an animated conceptual sequel to Neighborhood starring the young families of characters introduced in the former show's Neighborhood of Make-Believe segments.
 Peg + Cat, an animated show based on the picture book The Chicken Problem, which introduces concepts of math and problem-solving to young viewers.
 Odd Squad, a live-action show which focused on math and problem-solving and targets a somewhat older audience than Peg + Cat.
 Donkey Hodie, in association with Spiffy Pictures, premiered on PBS Kids on May 3, 2021. The series follows the life of the title character who is the grand-daughter of the original from the Mr. Rogers series.
 Alma's Way created by Sesame Street and Nickelodeon's The Loud House spinoff The Casagrandes star Sonia Manzano premiered on PBS Kids on October 4, 2021.

Filmography
 Mister Rogers' Neighborhood (1968-2001)
 Daniel Tiger's Neighborhood (2012-present)
 Peg + Cat (2013-2018)
 Odd Squad (2014-2022)
 Through the Woods (2017)
 A Beautiful Day in the Neighborhood (2019; uncredited)
 Donkey Hodie (2021-present)
 Alma's Way (2021-present)

References

External links
 Fred Rogers Productions

Television production companies of the United States
Mass media companies established in 1971
Non-profit_organizations based in Pittsburgh
1971 establishments in Pennsylvania
Fred Rogers